Chrysocale fletcheri is a moth of the subfamily Arctiinae. It was described by Viette in 1980. It is found in Peru.

References

Euchromiina
Moths described in 1980